Gilles Marini (born 26 January 1976) is a French actor known for his roles in the film Sex and the City, and in the American television shows Brothers & Sisters, Switched at Birth and Devious Maids. He was also the runner-up in season 8 of Dancing with the Stars, and was one of the returning celebrities in season 15. He was also a French co-host on the Netflix show Ultimate Beastmaster.

Early life

Marini was born in Grasse, Alpes-Maritimes, France, to a Greek mother and Italian father. He worked as a baker in his father's bakery from the age of eight. After completing high school, he joined the French army and was stationed in Paris, where he served as a fireman in the Paris Fire Brigade. There, Marini met Fred Goudon, a photographer who introduced him to the world of modeling. After fulfilling his military duties in his early twenties, he went to the United States to learn English while working as a model. One of his first jobs was a television commercial for Bud Light beer. He made his acting debut at the age of 29, in the 2005 horror film Screech of the Decapitated.

Career
Marini played Dante in Sex and the City: The Movie, and has appeared on Brothers & Sisters, Ugly Betty, Dirty Sexy Money, Criminal Minds, Nip/Tuck, The Bold and the Beautiful, Passions, and 2 Broke Girls. His film credits include One and the Other (L'Une et L'Autre) and The Boys & Girls Guide to Getting Down. On February 8, 2009, it was announced that Marini would participate in the eighth season of Dancing with the Stars. His professional partner was Cheryl Burke. He also took part in the fifteenth season of Dancing with the Stars for another chance to win the mirrorball trophy. He danced with season fourteen winner, Peta Murgatroyd. They were the eighth couple eliminated from the competition, alongside Kirstie Alley and Maksim Chmerkovskiy, on November 13, 2012.

In 2009, Marini was introduced as a recurring character on ABC's family drama Brothers & Sisters. He played Luc Laurent, the French love interest of Rachel Griffiths' character Sarah Walker, in what was slated to be a five-episode arc, but was promoted to series regular in 2010. Brothers & Sisters was cancelled by ABC in May 2011, after the fifth season ended. He also appeared as Bay Kennish's biological father, Angelo Sorrento, in Switched at Birth. On September 18, 2012, it was announced that he would become a series regular for the second season.

Dancing with the Stars performances
Marini and his professional partner, Cheryl Burke, came in as the runners-up of the eighth season of the American televised ballroom dancing competition Dancing with the Stars. On May 19, 2009, then seventeen-year-old gymnast Shawn Johnson and her partner, Mark Ballas, were crowned champions of that season, defeating Marini & Burke by 1%.

He returned alongside professional partner Peta Murgatroyd for the fifteenth season of Dancing with the Stars; the pair finished in sixth place.

Season 8: with professional dance partner Cheryl Burke 

Season average: 28.1

Season 15: with professional dance partner Peta Murgatroyd

 Additional score from guest judge: singer, dancer and choreographer Paula Abdul.
 For that week's salsa trio challenge, Marini & Murgatroyd chose Chelsie Hightower to dance alongside them.

Filmography

Film

Television

References

External links
 
 

1976 births
21st-century French male actors
French Army personnel
French emigrants to the United States
French expatriate male actors in the United States
French male film actors
French male television actors
French male models
French people of Greek descent
French people of Italian descent
Hollywood United players
Living people
People from Grasse
Association footballers not categorized by position
Association football players not categorized by nationality